Donny Brook is an album by organist Don Patterson with saxophonist Sonny Stitt recorded in 1969 and released on the Prestige label. The album features guitarist Grant Green who was credited as Blue Grant for contractual reasons, being then signed to Blue Note Records.

Reception

Allmusic awarded the album 4 stars stating "It's good organ jazz, although not the best performances in this style from the three lead players".

Track listing 
All compositions by Don Patterson except as noted
 "Donny Brook" (Grant Green) - 8:25  
 "Mud Turtle" - 9:58      
 "St. Thomas" (Sonny Rollins) - 5:28   
 "Good Bait" (Count Basie, Tadd Dameron) - 8:31  
 "Starry Night" (John H. Densmore) - 5:50

Personnel 
Don Patterson - organ
Sonny Stitt - varitone, tenor saxophone
Grant Green - guitar
Billy James - drums

References 

Don Patterson (organist) albums
Sonny Stitt albums
1970 albums
Prestige Records albums
Albums produced by Bob Porter (record producer)
Albums recorded at Van Gelder Studio